Three Japanese warships have borne the name Hibiki:

 , a  launched in 1906 and scrapped in 1928
 , an  launched in 1932 and transferred to the USSR in 1947
 , a 

Imperial Japanese Navy ship names
Japanese Navy ship names